Helen Ruth Elam (born July 18, 1928), better known as Baddiewinkle or Baddie Winkle, is an American Internet personality. Elam was born in Hazard, Kentucky. She became an Internet sensation at the age of eighty-five. Her social media tag line—"Stealing Your Man Since 1928"—was briefly popular in 2016. She is known for her humor and for fighting against ageism through her personal style and messaging, characterized by wearing eccentric clothes, promoting the legalization of medical marijuana, and her innuendo. Winkle is an activist and influencer whose self expression is a statement of disapproval of the beauty industry and the false limitations it imposes on individuals, and especially on women. She has millions of followers and views on social media, where she posts photos and videos of herself, often with suggestive clothing with peculiar prints, or little clothing in order to encourage body positivity and the celebration of the physiques of older adults.

Career
Winkle has gathered a following after initially getting help from her great granddaughter, Kennedy Lewis, to upload an image to Twitter, while wearing her great-granddaughter's clothes. She was subsequently followed by Rihanna, and now has a worldwide following. In 2015 she reached one million followers on Instagram. As if 2015, she lives in Richmond, Kentucky and has appeared on The Today Show, Australia.

In 2015, Grit Creative Group used her as the face of their website launch campaign, where she dressed as Kurt Cobain, Kate Moss and others. Baddie helped kick off season two of Nicole Richie's Candidly Nicole on VH1. She also appeared on the Red Carpet at the Netflix promotion for Orange Is the New Black.  She attended the 2015 MTV Video Music Awards as a guest of Miley Cyrus and MTV. Furthermore, in 2015 Baddiewinkle also starred in LunchMoney Lewis' “Ain’t Too Cool” music video.

In 2016, she was in a national commercial for Smirnoff ICE Electric Flavors as part of their "Keep It Moving" campaign. In August 2016 she was a guest on MTV's "Ridiculousness." She continues to entertain with her pictures, videos, and collaborations with well-known brands and celebrities. Time Magazine included Winkle in its "30 Most Influential People on the Internet" list in March 2016. Winkle was also named "Instagrammer of the Year" at the Eighth Annual Shorty Awards on April 11, 2016. In 2016 the fashion brand Missguided announced Baddie Winkle as their Christmas campaign spokeswoman.

Winkle appeared in her first ever national commercial for Smirnoff ICE Electric Flavors as part of the company's "Keep It Moving" campaign in 2016. She starred in Fergie's "Life Goes On' Music Video in 2016. In 2017, Winkle published her first book titled, Baddiewinkle’s Guide to Life.  In 2019, Winkle collaborated with INC.redible Cosmetics. Winkle was the face of the hair care brand Aussie's Blonde Hydration range in 2020. Baddie partnered with Tillamook Ice Cream to present their campaign in 2021. She featured in Sally Beauty's ad campaign which focused on self-expression and empowerment through brightly colored hair.

References

1928 births
Living people
Internet memes
People from Richmond, Kentucky
American Internet celebrities
Fashion influencers
Shorty Award winners